Tramping, known elsewhere as backpacking, rambling, hill walking or bushwalking, is a popular activity in New Zealand.

Tramping is defined as a recreational activity involving walking over rough country. Trampers often carry a backpack and wet-weather gear, and may also carry equipment for cooking and sleeping.

History
Alpine climbing has been a recreational activity from the early days of European settlement, and possibly earlier. From the 1950s tracks, huts and bridges were built in the forested areas of New Zealand to support hunters culling introduced deer species which had become a threat to the biodiversity of New Zealand. As tramping became popular these facilities were increasingly used by trampers. In later years tramping has become popular for both local and foreign tourists.

Tramping clubs were formed in many towns, cities and universities with regular trips being organised. The clubs sometimes own a bus to transport club members to the tracks.

Tramping tracks

A network of tramping tracks has been developed throughout New Zealand of varying lengths and difficulties. A small number of tramping tracks cross private land either in part or in full. All of the major tramping tracks are on public land that is administered by the Department of Conservation.

Among the best-known tracks are the ten Great Walks and the ultra-long-distance Te Araroa.

Huts

There is a network of more than 950 backcountry huts throughout New Zealand operated by the Department of Conservation (DOC) on public land. Some areas have privately owned huts on public land used for commercial tourism operations. The majority of the huts were built by the now defunct New Zealand Forest Service for deer culling operations. Other huts were built by alpine clubs, schools, and ski clubs. Some of the buildings on public land that are readily accessible by vehicle, are generally "baches" or "cribs" built by private individuals when control of the use of public land was less stringent. These baches are not made available to the public. 
Some public huts are associated with a local club and volunteers from clubs will perform much of the maintenance on these huts. In the Tararua Forest Park north of Wellington huts are managed in a partnership between DOC and various lower North Island clubs. In the eastern Southern Alps near Christchurch some huts are managed solely by the Canterbury Mountaineering Club and they rely on fees from these huts to help pay the cost of maintenance.
 
Amongst experienced trampers there is a strong culture of looking after huts. The phrase "hut etiquette" encompasses looking after any hut that is used and showing consideration for other hut users. Most huts on the conservation estate are open to the public and the state of a hut depends on the care by those who use it.

Environmental care code
This environmental care code promoted by the Department of Conservation contains a 10-point checklist of things that can be done in the outdoors to help minimise impact:

See also

National parks of New Zealand
Forest parks of New Zealand
Regional parks of New Zealand
Protected areas of New Zealand
Conservation in New Zealand
Camping in New Zealand

References

Further reading

External links

Federated Mountain Clubs of New Zealand - an umbrella lobby group representing outdoors organisations
Bushcraft New Zealand - information about enjoying the New Zealand outdoors
New Zealand Tramper - tramping related information
Tramping - Te Ara the Encyclopedia of New Zealand

 
New Zealand culture